Yorùbá medicine, or egbòogi, is an African system of herbalism practiced primarily in West Africa and the Caribbean.

Basic philosophies
According to A D Buckley, Yorùbá medicine has major similarities to conventional medicine in the sense that its main thrust is to kill or expel from the body tiny, invisible "germs" or insects (kòkòrò and also worms (aràn) which inhabit small bags within the body. For the Yoruba, however, these insects and worms perform useful functions in the healthy body, aiding digestion, fertility, etc. However, if they become too powerful in the body, they must be controlled, killed or driven out with bitter-tasting plants contained in medicines. Yorùbá medicine is quite different from homeopathy, which uses medicinal ingredients that imitates pathological symptoms. Rather, in a similar manner to mainstream Orthodox medicine, it strives to destroy the agents that cause disease.

Buckley claims that traditional Yorùbá ideas of the human body are derived from the image of a cooking pot, susceptible to overflowing. The female body overflows dangerously but necessarily once a month; insects and worms in the body can overflow their "bags" in the body if they are given too much “sweet” (tasty) food. The household is understood in a similar way. As agents of disease overflow their bag, menstrual blood the female body, and palm oil the cooking pot, so women in the marital household tend to overflow and return to their natal homes.

As well as using bitter plants to kill germs and worms, Yorùbá herbalists also use incantation (ọfọ̀) in medicines to bring good luck (àwúre), for example, to bring money or love. Medicinal incantations are in some ways like the praise songs addressed to human beings or gods: their purpose is to awaken the power of the ingredients hidden in the medicine. Most medicinal incantations use a form of word-play, similar to punning, to evoke the properties of the plants implied by the name of the plant.

Yorùbá traditionalists claim in their oratory history that Ọ̀rúnmìlà taught the people the customs of divination, prayer, dance, symbolic gestures, personal, and communal elevation. They believe he also advised his people on spiritual baths, inner reflection, and herbal medicine in particular.

Controversy

Integration
Oyelakin suggests that the major difference between Yorùbá medicine and orthodox medicine is that the former is homeopathic in nature while the later is allopathic.

He goes on to say that the orthodox methodology for the treatment of diseases is based on what he called "the contrary principle," which states that: illnesses and diseases should be treated with chemical agents that produce effects that are in opposition to those exhibited by the illnesses being treated.  This type of practise is concerned with the elimination of symptoms.

However, according to Makinde: The treatment of a disease is the application of what such disease is forbidden to come in contact with, at whose sight must simply disappear. 

Homeopathic medicine is said to be more concerned with identifying the causes of the illness and disease in an effort to restore holistic balance in the biological system. While the claim that allopathic approaches, of which orthodox medicine is a form, is only occupied with getting rid of the symptoms rather than concerned with identifying and removing the causes of illness is not entirely true (e.g., the link between STDs and casual intercourse), homeopathic adherents would suggest that Yorùbá medicine performs three distinct functions: 
Getting rid of the symptoms,
Identifying and removing the causes of the illness, and
Maintaining a holistic balance in the patient.

Holistic Health

Modern orthodox medicine has a place for this concept whereby all aspects of the patients needs, psychological, physical and social, and mentally are said to be taken into account and seen as a whole. However, from the Yorùbá viewpoint, traditional Yorùbá medicine further delves into other aspects in terms of the patient's emotional and spiritual balance/imbalance.Yorubic medicine has come to be widely known in Nigeria as the ultimate traditional medical practice due to its holistic approach to treatment.

In his piece on "Yorùbá Culture" Kola Abimbola stipulates that in order to achieve a holistic healing through Yorùbá medicine, some certain conditions must hold. For instance, the medical practitioner would be interested in the spiritual causes of the illness. To do this, there is the need for the understanding of the constitution of man. For him, a person has two parts which he describes as "the body" and "the soul".

Taking into account one's body, mind, emotions, and spiritual life, holistic health combines the best of modern diagnosis and monitoring techniques with both ancient and innovative health methods. These can include natural diet and herbal remedies, nutritional supplements, exercise, relaxation, psycho-spiritual counseling, meditation, breathing exercises, and other self-regulatory practices. It addresses not only symptoms, but the entire person, and his or her current life predicament, including family, job, and religious life. It emphasizes prevention, health maintenance, high-level wellness and longevity. It views the client as an active participant in the healing process, rather than simply a passive recipient of "health care." At once personal, ecological, and transcultural, holism has become the new health paradigm for the 21st century.

Òrìṣà in Yorùbá Medicine

Tradition has it that many Orishas (deities/divinities) play a significant role in the life of the Yorùbás in this form of medicine. And this "Ọ̀sányín/Ọ̀sáín," or 'the whispering genie,' is deemed one of the most important Òrìṣàs in Yoruba medicine.

Ọ̀sáín is associated with dominion over all wild herbs, and is considered by most practitioners as the greatest herbalist that ever lived. In Africa there are so many herbs and plants that can be used in healing, that only someone with a "trained eye" can take full advantage of their functions. For instance, although plants and herbs have their purely medicinal value, they also carry mystical value.

The "Osainista" is said to be an expert in local herbology, possessing the "know how" on herbs and plants and the correct gathering of the necessary herbs and plants for the right cause. Some plants are to be gathered at certain times of the day or night. Certain plants are meant to be exposed to the necessary incantation(s) and implementation of offerings in order to reap adequate results. As said before there are a multitude of Òrìṣà's, each with their physical qualities and herbal attributes and sometimes interwoven into one another.

Ifá has been said to also play an important role towards achieving the end product of any one healing process.

Titles and Processes
An "Oníṣègùn" refers to a herbalist, an "Olóògùn" is one of several terms for a medical practitioner, and a "Babaláwo" is a priest/priestess.

An Olóògùn, in addition to analyzing symptoms of the patient, look for the emotional and spiritual causes of the disease to placate the negative forces (ajogun) and only then will propose treatment that he/she deems appropriate. This may include herbs in the form of an infusion, enema, etc. In Yoruban medicine they also use dances, spiritual baths, symbolic sacrifice, song/prayer, and a change of diet to help cure the sick. They also believe that the only true and complete cure can be a change of 'consciousness' where the individual can recognize the root of the problem themselves and seek to eliminate it. Disease to the Yorùbás is seen as a disruption of our connection with the Earth.The Olóògùn is often a priest or priestess, or belongs to a guild-like society hidden within tribal boundaries. Even obtaining an education in medicine may require becoming an initiate of one of these societies. The worldview of a priest involves training and discipline to interpret events that are indicative of the nature of the patient's alignment with their own conscious and unrecognized issues, as well as with a variety of external forces and beings which inhabit our realm and require the inner vision and wisdom of the priest to interpret.

Yorubas are great believers of preventative medication. They are critical in the way they relate to modern western medicine. According to elite practitioners, if we listen to our bodies they will provide us with the preparation and appropriate knowledge we need to regain our balance with our immediate surroundings.

See also 
 Traditional African medicine

References

External links
African Medicine

Traditional medicine
Traditional African medicine
Medicine